The Four Ancient Books of Wales is a term coined by William Forbes Skene to describe four important medieval manuscripts written in Middle Welsh and dating from the 13th, 14th, and 15th centuries.  They contain primarily texts of poetry and prose, some of which are contemporary and others which may have originated from traditions dating back to as early as the sixth and seventh centuries.  These also contain some of the earliest native Welsh references to King Arthur.

The four books included by Skene in his list are:
 The Black Book of Carmarthen
 The Book of Taliesin
 The Book of Aneirin
 The Red Book of Hergest

The principal texts of the Four Ancient Books of Wales were edited and translated in a two volume compilation by William Forbes Skene in 1868. By the standards of modern scholarship the edition is seriously flawed with numerous transcription errors and consequently inaccurate translating. Skene was assisted by Daniel Silvan Evans who was probably responsible for most of the translations.

References

External links 

14th-century books
Welsh manuscripts
Medieval Welsh literature
Welsh-language literature
Arthurian literature in Welsh
Welsh mythology
Taliesin